is a crossover tactical role-playing game developed by Banpresto for PlayStation 3 and PlayStation Vita. The game crosses over heroines from various anime series in a style similar to the Super Robot Taisen series. The game was published by Namco Bandai Games and released on February 6, 2014, in Japan.

References

2014 video games
Japan-exclusive video games
Bandai Namco games
Video games featuring female protagonists
PlayStation 3 games
PlayStation Vita games
Crossover role-playing video games
Video games developed in Japan